General Pope may refer to:

Harold Pope (soldier) (1873–1938), Australian Imperial Force temporary brigadier general
John Pope (military officer) (1822–1892), Union Army major general
Maurice Arthur Pope (1889–1978), Canadian Army lieutenant general
Nick Pope (British Army officer) (born 1962), British Army lieutenant general
Sydney B. Pope (1879–1955), British Indian Army major general
Vyvyan Pope (1891–1941), British Army lieutenant general

See also
Richard Pope-Hennessy (1875–1942), British Army major general